The Kansai Ki-in, i.e., Kansai Go Association, is an organizational body for the game of Go in Japan, which was founded by Hashimoto Utaro in 1950.  Though it is not as large as its chief rival, the Nihon Ki-in, it also issues diplomas to strong players and oversees professionals as the Nihon Ki-in does.

World War II created great difficulties in traveling from the Osaka region to Tokyo for Nihon Ki-in events.  The Nihon Ki-in created a western branch, but when a dispute over the Honinbo title arose in 1950, this branch declared its independence.

See also 

 International Go Federation
 List of professional Go tournaments
 Nihon Ki-in (Japanese Go Association)
 All Japan Student Go Federation
 Hanguk Kiwon (Korean Go Association)
 Zhongguo Qiyuan (Chinese Go Association)
 Taiwan Chi-Yuan (Taiwanese Go Association)
 Hoensha
 American Go Association

Famous players at Kansai Ki-in

 Daisuke Murakawa
 Dogen Handa
 Hideyuki Sakai
 Manfred Wimmer
 Satoshi Yuki
 Shoji Hashimoto

External links
 Official Website of Kansai Ki-in

Go organizations
1950 establishments in Japan